Good Evening New York City is a CD/DVD double live album by Paul McCartney consisting of material performed over three nights as the inaugural concerts at New York City's Citi Field, 17, 18 and 21 July 2009, part of his Summer Live '09 concert tour. Over 180,000 tickets were sold within hours of the shows being announced. The album is McCartney's third release for Hear Music, following 2007 album Memory Almost Full and the live EP Amoeba's Secret. Previous McCartney live albums such as Back in the US proved to be huge sellers based on his record-breaking live shows from the 2000s.

At the 53rd Grammy Awards, the recording of "Helter Skelter" from the album won in the category of Best Solo Rock Vocal Performance.

Description
The concert footage featured on the standard edition of the set was directed by Paul Becher, who has overseen live visuals for McCartney for over 200 performances. The performances were shot using 15 cameras and digital footage incorporated from 75 flipcams handed out to fans over the course of the three night stand. The audio mix, in both stereo and 5.1, was handled by longtime Beatles engineer Geoff Emerick, and also longtime McCartney engineer Paul Hicks, whose credits include the recent Beatles remasters, The Beatles Anthology and Let It Be... Naked, and two Grammy awards for his mixing work on the Beatles' Love album.

The documented concerts held special significance for McCartney and his fans. Citi Field sits adjacent to the site of the former Shea Stadium, where his former band, The Beatles, set record attendance figures in 1965. In 2008, McCartney joined Billy Joel onstage for the final rock show at Shea Stadium before its demolition. Joel returned the favour for the first of McCartney's July performances, the first concerts to be held at Citi Field. Of the 20 Beatles songs performed on the album, 17 of these were released after the original Beatles performance, with "I'm Down" the only common song.

The performances of "Sing the Changes", "Jet", and "Band on the Run" included in this set were released as a downloadable three-track pack for the Rock Band video game on 5 January 2010.

Formats
The package is available in two formats: a 3-disc (2 CD + 1 DVD) standard edition and a 4-disc (2 CD + 2 DVD) deluxe version featuring expanded packaging and a bonus DVD including McCartney's 15 July performance on the Ed Sullivan Theater marquee for his appearance on the Late Show with David Letterman.

The deluxe edition is available from an album specific store set up through McCartney's website and through Best Buy stores.

Track listing

Standard and Deluxe Edition CDs/DVD

Deluxe Edition Bonus DVD

Good Evening People (audience documentary film)
"I'm Down" (full performance)

Personnel
Paul McCartney – lead vocals, bass guitar, acoustic guitar, piano, electric guitar, ukulele, mandolin
Rusty Anderson – electric and acoustic guitars, backing vocals, co-lead vocals on "I've Got a Feeling"
Brian Ray – bass guitar, rhythm and acoustic guitars, backing vocals
Paul Wickens – keyboards, electric guitar, accordion, harmonica, percussion, backing vocals
Abe Laboriel Jr. – drums, percussion, backing vocals
Billy Joel - co-lead vocals and piano on "I Saw Her Standing There"
This is the same band which performed on McCartney's previous live album Back in the U.S.. Wickens had been with McCartney since his first live album Tripping the Live Fantastic in 1990.

Charts

Weekly charts

Year-end charts

Certifications

Release history

See also
The Beatles at Shea Stadium
Summer Live '09

Notes

External links
PaulMcCartney.com – official website
Set list from Citi Field shows on PaulMcCartney.com

Albums produced by Paul McCartney
Paul McCartney live albums
Live video albums
Paul McCartney video albums
2009 video albums
2009 live albums
Hear Music live albums
Hear Music video albums